Santa Chiara is Italian for Saint Clare, and may refer to:

Churches
 Basilica di Santa Chiara, in Assisi
 Monastero di Santa Chiara, a church in San Marino
 Santa Chiara a Vigna Clara, a church in Rome
 Santa Chiara, Bra, a church in Bra, Cuneo, Piedmont, Italy
 Santa Chiara, Camerino, a church and monastery in Camerino, Macerata, Marche, Italy
 Santa Chiara, Carpi, in Carpi, Emilia-Romagna, Italy
 Santa Chiara, Correggio, a church and convent in Correggio, Reggio Emilia, Emilia-Romagna, Italy
 Santa Chiara, Fanano, a church and convent in Fanano, Modena, Emilia-Romagna, Italy
 Santa Chiara, Naples, a religious complex in Naples, Italy
 Santa Chiara all'Albergaria, a monastery and church in Palermo, Italy
 Santa Chiara, Pieve di Cento, a church in Pieve di Cento, Emilia-Romagna, Italy
 Santa Chiara, Pisa, a church in Pisa, Tuscany, Italy
 Santa Chiara, Rimini, a church in Rimini, Italy
 Santa Chiara, Rome, a church in Rome, Italy
 Santa Chiara, Sansepolcro, a former church in Sansepolcro, Arezzo, Tuscany, Italy
 Santa Chiara, Treia, a church in Treia, Macerata, Marche, Italy
 Santa Chiara, Turin, a church in Turin, Italy
 Santa Chiara, Urbania, a former church and convent in Urbania, Marche, Italy
 Santi Cosma e Damiano, Alcamo, a church and convent in Alcamo, Trapani, Sicily, Italy, also called Chiesa di Santa Chiara

People
 St. Clare of Assisi, founder of the Poor Clares and companion of St. Francis
 St. Clare of Montefalco, an Augustinian nun and abbess of the 13th century
 Expressionist Master of Santa Chiara (fl. 1290–1330), an Umbrian painter

See also
 St. Clare's Church (disambiguation)